Ideographic Description Characters is a Unicode block containing graphic characters used for describing CJK ideographs. They are used in Ideographic Description Sequences (IDS) to provide a description of an ideograph, in terms of what other ideographs make it up and how they are laid out relative to one another. An IDS provides the reader with a description of an ideograph that cannot be represented properly, usually because it is not encoded in Unicode; rendering systems are not intended to automatically compose the pieces into a complete ideograph, and the descriptions are not standardized.

Block

History
The following Unicode-related documents record the purpose and process of defining specific characters in the Ideographic Description Characters block:

Ideographic Description Sequences 
This is the syntax of IDS in EBNF:
IDS := Ideographic | Radical | CJK_Stroke | Private Use | U+FF1F | IDS_BinaryOperator IDS IDS | IDS_TrinaryOperator IDS IDS IDS 
CJK_Stroke := U+31C0 | U+31C1 | ... | U+31E3 
IDS_BinaryOperator := U+2FF0 | U+2FF1 | U+2FF4 | U+2FF5 | U+2FF6 | U+2FF7 | U+2FF8 | U+2FF9 | U+2FFA | U+2FFB 
IDS_TrinaryOperator:= U+2FF2 | U+2FF3

See also
Chinese character description languages
Specials (Unicode block)

References 

Unicode blocks